Moreton Corbet Castle is a ruined medieval castle and Elizabethan era manor house, located near the village of Moreton Corbet, Shropshire, England. It is a Grade I listed building and English Heritage property. Although out of use since the 18th century, it remains the property of the Corbet baronets. It can be visited free of charge during daylight hours.

History

Medieval stronghold

In 1086 two Anglo Saxon thegns, Hunning and Wulfgeat, were living at Moreton Corbet. By the early thirteenth century the structure had been replaced by another, built by Toret, an Englishman. His descendant Peter Toret was lord of Moreton Corbet by 1166 and it is likely that he was living in the castle. In February 1216 William Marshall stormed Moreton Corbet castle on behalf of King John of England against Bartholomew Toret. At this time the castle was known as Moreton Toret Castle. In 1235 Bartholomew died and Richard de Corbet, his son-in-law, inherited the castle and changed its name to Moreton Corbet.

The keep or great tower to the west was connected to the gatehouse by a curtain wall, which then curved south and looped to encircle the site, creating a bailey or courtyard. The roof of the gatehouse has not survived, but the corbel work that supported the roof and tower battlements of the castle is still extant.

At the western end of the extant curtain wall is a rectangular keep of two stories and a basement, dating from between the eleventh and early thirteenth centuries. It was entered through an elevated doorway, and the fireplaces on the lower residential floor are still visible.

Elizabethan house

In the 16th century, Sir Andrew Corbet filled the courtyard to the east of the keep with a new house, stretching in a straight line to the south and west of the medieval structure. The perimeter wall to the west and south of the tower is now almost completely removed, leaving a gap between the castle and the later house.

Corbet adapted the medieval gatehouse with a gothic arch. In 1579, a year after Corbet had died, A carving of his monogram and the year were added, surmounting another rectangular stone bearing the family crest of an elephant and castle in relief.

Corbet had a large domestic range built against the curtain wall, with kitchens below and accommodation above. East and south of the gatehouse, the domestic ranges opened into a great hall. A large fireplace is apparent on the first floor, with a smaller one on the lower floor. Doorways were made through the curtain wall to the latrines. The keep was converted into a storehouse.

South of the castle, Corbet's son Robert had a wide but shallow house built in a more modern style, described by the noted antiquarian William Camden (1551–1623) as "a most gorgeous and stately house after the Italian model." It seems to have been influenced by the classical architecture of Italian buildings that he saw on his diplomatic travels, including Palladio's Basilica Palladiana in Vicenza. The building was faced with stone, but internally the walls were of brick. Although Italian in inspiration and elaborately decorated, much of the carving was of a rustic finish. After Robert Corbet died of the plague in 1583, his brothers Richard and Vincent Corbet carried on with the building of the new manor, leaving what was left of the original fortification.

Civil War
During the English Civil War, Moreton Castle was used as part of Royalist Shrewsbury's defence. The castle was under siege on more than one occasion, and badly damaged in the fighting. The surviving ruins of the walls are pock-marked from musket shot.

Gallery

See also
 Grade I listed buildings in Shropshire
 Listed buildings in Moreton Corbet and Lee Brockhurst
 Castles in Great Britain and Ireland
 List of castles in England

References

External links

 
 
 Bibliography of sources relating to Moreton Corbet Castle
 Geograph® Britain and Ireland > Photos of Moreton Corbet castle and surrounding area

Castles in Shropshire
English Heritage sites in Shropshire
Country houses in Shropshire
Ruins in Shropshire
Grade I listed buildings in Shropshire
Ruined castles in England
Grade I listed ruins
Grade I listed castles